is a Japanese Buddhist religious movement based on the teachings of the 13th-century Japanese priest Nichiren as taught by its first three presidents Tsunesaburō Makiguchi, Jōsei Toda, and Daisaku Ikeda. It is the largest of the Japanese new religions and claims the largest membership among Nichiren Buddhist groups. The organization bases its teachings on Nichiren's interpretation of the Lotus Sutra and places chanting Nam Myōhō Renge Kyō at the center of devotional practice. The organization promotes its goals as supporting "peace, culture, and education".

The movement was founded by educators Makiguchi and Toda on 18 November 1930, and held its inaugural meeting in 1937. It was disbanded during the Second World War when much of the leadership was imprisoned for violations of the 1925 Peace Preservation Law and charges of lèse-majesté.  After the war, it expanded to a claimed total of 750,000 households in 1958 through explosive recruitment, held to be unprecedented in Japanese media. Further expansion was led by its former third president Daisaku Ikeda. According to its own account, has 12 million members in 192 countries and territories around the world.

Moving the group toward mainstream acceptance, the organization is still viewed with suspicion in Japan and has found itself embroiled in public controversies, especially in the first three decades following World War II. From 1952 to 1991, it was affiliated with the Nichiren Shōshū Buddhist sect. Komeito, a political party closely aligned with Soka Gakkai and founded by elements of its lay membership, entered a coalition agreement with the Liberal Democratic Party in 1999 and is currently a junior partner in government.

Beliefs

The belief of the Soka Gakkai centers on recognizing that all life has dignity with infinite inherent potential; this immanent Buddhahood exists in every person and can be awakened through the Buddhist practice prescribed by Nichiren. Further, a person's social actions at every moment can lead to soka, or the creation of value (the theory of the interdependence of life). Societal change is facilitated through "human revolution", a way of living in the world that creates value.

The doctrine of the Soka Gakkai derives from Nichiren, who promulgated the Lotus Sutra as he perceived its application to the epoch in which he and people today live. Soka Gakkai gives significance to Nichiren's writings, as Gosho, and Soka Gakkai refers to the collection of Nichiren's writings that was compiled by Nichiko Hori and Jōsei Toda, published as Nichiren Daishonin Gosho Zenshu in 1952 (and later officially published an English translation, The Writings of Nichiren Daishonin, and in several other languages based on the collection).

The principle of the mutually inclusive relationship of a single moment of life and all phenomena

T’ien-t’ai (538–597), a Chinese Buddhist scholar who upheld the Lotus Sutra, developed a theoretical system to describe the infinite interconnectedness of life translated as "the principle of the mutually inclusive relationship of a single moment of life and all phenomena" or "three thousand realms in a single moment of life" (Japanese: ichinen sanzen). This theory demonstrates that the entire phenomenal world exists in a single moment of life. Soka Gakkai members believe that because Nichiren made actualizing this possible by inscribing Gohonzon and teaching the invocation, their prayers and actions can in a single moment pierce through limitations.

"Life force" and "Human Revolution" 

While imprisoned, Josei Toda studied a passage from the Immeasurable meanings sutra (considered the introduction to the Lotus Sutra) that describes Buddhahood by means of 34 negations – for example, that it is "neither being nor non-being, this nor that, square nor round". From this, he concluded that "Buddha" is life, or life force.

The "philosophy of life" restates principles formulated by Nichiren: "three thousand conditions in a single moment" (ichinen sanzen), and "observing one's own mind" (kanjin)

The concept of life force is central to the Soka Gakkai's conception of the role of religion and the application of Nichiren's teachings.  "Our health, courage, wisdom, joy, desire to improve, self-discipline, and so on, could all be said to depend on our life force", Ikeda says.

Toda considered that the concept of "Buddha as life (force) means that Buddhism entails transforming society. Ikeda has been quoted as saying "Faith is firm belief in the universe and the life force. Only a person of firm faith can lead a good and vigorous life ... Buddhist doctrine is a philosophy that has human life as its ultimate object, and our Human Revolution movement is an act of reform aimed at opening up the inner universe, the creative life force within each individual, and leading to human freedom."

Soka Gakkai teaches that this "self-induced change in each individual" – which Josei Toda began referring to as "human revolution" – is what leads to happiness and peace.  While older schools taught the attainment of Buddhahood in this life through the Gohonzon, they did not tie this to social engagement.  Toda's conception of life force and human revolution means that one attains Buddhahood "through engagement in the realities of daily life, through attaining benefits and happiness that involve all of life, and through extending this happiness to others".

Oneness of mentor and disciple 

The Soka Gakkai liturgy refers to all of its first three presidents – Tsunesabura Makiguchi, Josei Toda and Daisaku Ikeda – as "the eternal mentors of kosen-rufu", and "Soka Gakkai's long-time leader, Ikeda is revered by Gakkai members". The relationship between members and their mentors is referred to as "the oneness of mentor and disciple".  The mentor is to lead and thereby improve the lives of his disciples. The mentor's actions is seen as giving disciples confidence in their own unrealized potential.  The role of disciples is seen as supporting their mentor and realizing his vision using their unique abilities and circumstances. The relationship is seen as non-hierarchical and mutually weighted. Disciples are encouraged to be active creators rather than passive followers. Seager writes: "The oneness of the mentor-disciple relationship is described not in terms of demands and duties as many critics imagine it to be, but in terms of choice, freedom and responsibility. It is the disciple's choice and decision to follow the mentor's vision for their common goal. In response, it is the mentor's wish to raise and foster the disciple to become greater than the mentor.

Since the mid-1990s, the issue of the oneness of mentor and disciple has received more prominence in the Soka Gakkai.  There is a strong emphasis on "cultivating all members ... in discipleship" through forging "affective one-to-one relationships with Ikeda".

"On Establishing the Correct Teaching for the Peace of the Land"

Nichiren wrote a treatise "On Establishing the Correct Teaching for the Peace of the Land" in 1260 CE and submitted it to the regent. Soka Gakkai members believe that it is one of his most important writings.  In it, he claimed that the source of the natural disasters Japan faced at that time was due to the weakened spirit of its people, caused by attachments to religions that disavow the primacy of the people themselves. He called for the leaders and people to base their spiritual life on the Lotus Sutra, "the correct teaching", which would, in turn, lead to "the peace of the land".

Ikeda has said, "Nichiren stressed the need to spread the correct teaching and firmly establish the philosophical principles of Buddhism in the heart of each individual."  Hence, "establishing the correct teaching" is the Soka Gakkai's religious mission, while "establishing the peace of the land" is its social mission.

Reading this writing largely influenced Makiguchi to embrace Nichiren Buddhism; at his first meeting, Ikeda decided to make Toda his mentor after hearing the latter lecture on this writing. Soka Gakkai members believe "the peace of the land" depends on transforming the heart and mind of one individual at a time, affirming the basic good within all people, respecting human dignity and the sanctity of life, and valuing dialogue. Furthermore, Soka Gakkai members believe these principles must become the spiritual foundation for peace in society and require joining forces with like-minded individuals and organizations.

Five "Eternal Guidelines of Faith" 
In 1957, former Soka Gakkai president Josei Toda proclaimed three "Eternal Guidelines of Faith".  In 2003, third President Daisaku Ikeda added two more guidelines.  The Five Guidelines of Faith are:

 Faith for a harmonious family;
 Faith for each person to become happy;
 Faith for surmounting obstacles;
 Faith for health and long life;
 Faith for absolute victory.

Relation to the Lotus Sutra
Soka Gakkai members pray to Nichiren's Gohonzon (see section on Gohonzon), which "embodies Nam-myoho-renge-kyo, the essence of the Lotus Sutra". The Gohonzon includes the Sutra's teaching that all life inherently possesses dignity when "illuminated by the light of the Mystic Law". (The Real Aspect of the Gohonzon p 832), and depicts the ceremony in which bodhissatvas embrace "their mission to teach and preach to suffering people the path to happiness and freedom".

The Soka Gakkai's history is closely intertwined with the study of the Lotus Sutra.  Josei Toda began the postwar reconstruction by lecturing on the sutra, the study of which led to what Soka Gakkai considers his enlightenment (see "Life Force and Human Revolution") After the Soka Gakkai's excommunication by Nichiren Shōshū, Daisaku Ikeda conducted dialogue sessions on the Lotus Sutra which resulted in the publication of a six-volume work called The Wisdom of the Lotus Sutra. The Soka Gakkai also sponsored the Burton Watson translation of the Lotus Sutra as well as several international exhibitions about the Lotus Sutra.  Ikeda has referenced the Lotus Sutra in many of the annual peace proposals he submits to the United Nations.  He compared the awakening of women mentored by Wangari Maathai to the essence of the Lotus Sutra, "a transformation from individuals seeking salvation to individuals taking action to help others free themselves from suffering."

Karma (as "changing karma into mission") 
The concept of karma is based on the law of causality. It refers to consequences created through one's actions, words or thoughts.
Early Buddhism and as Professor Ved Nanda explains Hindus believe to redress karma accumulated over the course of many eons, one must be reincarnated numerous times. The concept of karma then often became a source of despair as well as a tool for Buddhist clergy to instill fear and guilt in the minds of believers.  Soka Gakkai Nichiren Buddhism, however, believes that the fundamental cause for revealing the ultimate potential of life, or Buddha nature, can diminish the influence of negative karma in the present lifetime.

Ikeda explains that negative karma is subsumed in the world of Buddhahood and is purified by its power. Importantly, Soka Gakkai members believe effects are determined simultaneously with causes, though they remain latent until the right external influences bring them to fruition. Soka Gakkai Buddhism teaches that even the most stubborn karma can be overcome as one reveals one's Buddha nature in this lifetime. Thus, karma becomes a source of hope and mission rather than despair.

Practices
The practice of Soka Gakkai members is directed to "oneself and others".

Chanting
The words Nam-myoho-renge-kyo (also called Daimoku) is the main practice of the organization, which is claimed to express the true nature of life through cause and effect.

The believers of the organization chant these words reputed to change their lives, including the natural environments in which they live. Accordingly, the intended goal is to produce an internal change that serves as the motivator for external social change. Furthermore, the organization teaches that chanting cannot be divorced from action.

Soka Gakkai members believe that chanting releases the power of the universal life force inherent in life.  For some members, chanting for material benefits is a first step toward realizing the ultimate goal of Buddhahood. It further claims that there is no separation between life in the world and the universal life of Buddhahood, and leads to effects in daily life Thus, Buddhahood is expressed to be as the process of transforming, and as the actual transformation of, daily life. Therefore, chanting is not approached as a passive exercise, as Soka Gakkai literature urges practitioners to have "conviction", tenacity and perseverance and to challenge their personal problems.

Soka Gakkai, excommunicated from Nichiren Shoshu in 1991, has a custom of chanting excerpts from the Lotus Sutra and its title as part of morning and evening prayers. Soka Gakkai, like the sect, receives the Gohonzon and places it on a unique altar called "Gakkai-Yo" (for Gakkai use), and performs the service facing it. It can be substituted for the installation of a Buddhist altar. If one is unable to perform the service at home for an extended period of time due to a business trip, a single family assignment, hospitalization, or other reasons, he or she may receive a loan of an Omamori Gohonzon from the branch or ward headquarters to which he or she belongs.

Gohonzon

The Gohonzon Soka Gakkai members enshrine in their homes and centers is a transcription by the 26th High Priest Nichikan Shonin. The central main syllabary of characters reads Namu-Myoho-Renge-Kyo (Kanji: 南 無 妙 法 蓮 華 經). The lower portion reads "Nichi-Ren" (Kanji: 日 蓮).  On the corners are the names of the Four Heavenly Kings from Buddhist cosmology, and the remaining characters are names of Buddhist deities reputed to represent the various conditions of life.

The organization teaches that in contrast to worshiping the Buddha or Dharma as anthropomorphized personifications, Nichiren deliberately made a calligraphic mandala, rather than Buddhist statues as the central object of devotion.  American author, Richard Seager explains the following:

The Soka Gakkai often uses Nichiren's metaphor of a mirror to explain its faith in the Gohonzon.  The Gohonzon "reflects life's innate enlightened nature and cause it to permeate every aspect of member's lives". Members chant to the Gohonzon "to reveal the power of their own enlightened wisdom and vow to put it to use for the good of themselves and others". The organization teaches that a member is considered to be practicing the Lotus Sutra when chanting Nam-Myoho-Renge-Kyo to the Gohonzon.

Faith, practice, and study
The primary practice of the Soka Gakkai, like that of most Nichiren sects, is chanting Nam-myoho-renge-kyo, which is the
title of the Lotus Sutra, and simultaneously considered the Buddha nature inherent in life and the ultimate reality of existence.  The supplemental practice is the daily recitation of parts of the 2nd and 16th chapters of the Lotus Sutra.  Unlike other Nichiren sects, the Soka Gakkai stresses that practicing for this enlightenment entails actual "engagement in the realities of daily life", while including the happiness of others in one's own practice.

Believers claim that the Lotus Sutra contains principles or teachings that are not readily apparent. Furthermore, the organization claims that Nichiren revealed these teachings as The "Three Great Secret Laws" namely the following:.
 The "Object of Devotion" (Gohonzon mandala) used and designated by the Soka Gakkai organization
 The incantation (of Nam-myoho-renge-kyo) by united SGI believers
 The sanctuary or place where Buddhism is practiced.

In addition, the Soka Gakkai publishes study materials, including the writings of Nichiren and the Lotus Sutra, and has a well-developed program of study. Its series of study examinations reflects its roots as an educational reform society. As a New Religion, Soka Gakkai practices Nichiren Buddhism as it has been expounded by its three founding presidents, and so also studies their speeches and writings, especially those of 3rd President Daisaku Ikeda.  His novelized histories of the movement, The Human Revolution (and its sequel The New Human Revolution) have been said to have "canonical status" as it "functions as a source of inspiration and guidance for members". Study meetings are held monthly. "The tenor of the meetings is one of open discussion rather than didactic teaching..." Discussions on Nichiren's teachings are welcomed, "dictatorial edicts on moral behavior are not."

The Soka Gakkai practice also includes activities beyond the ritualistic, such as meetings, social engagement, and improving one's circumstances; these also have significance as religious activities in the Soka Gakkai.

The practices to improve oneself while helping others, and the study of Buddhism, combine with "faith" in what the Soka Gakkai considers "the three basic aspects of Nichiren Buddhism" – faith, practice and study. Faith, as explained in a booklet given by SGI-USA to prospective new members, is an expectation that deepens with experience as one practices in the Soka Gakkai.

Discussion meetings

Gakkai meetings have been called "formal liturgies" in that their format – "chanting, relatos (experiences), teachings, inspiring entertainment" – is identical from place to place. Discussion meetings are among the most important activities of the Soka Gakkai. Professor of philosophy at Virginia Tech University Jim Garrison writes that John Dewey's belief "that the heart and guarantee of democracy is in free gatherings of neighbors and friends in the living rooms of houses and apartments to converse freely with one another." Garrison points out that the Soka Gakkai grew out of precisely such gatherings. "Soka Gakkai discussion meetings are a wonderful example of grass-roots democracy."

At discussion meetings, participants are encouraged to take responsibility "for their own lives and for wider social and global concerns". The format is an example of how the Soka Gakkai is able to "dispense with much of the apparatus of conventional church organization".

Proselytizing
At one time, the Soka Gakkai's expansion methods were controversial, as it employed a Buddhist method called shakubuku, a term employed by Nichiren, translated as "break and subdue (attachments to inferior teachings)."

The reason for propagation, as explained by Josei Toda, is "not to make the Soka Gakkai larger but for you to become happier ... There are many people in the world who are suffering from poverty and disease. The only way to make them really happy is to shakubuku them."

In 1970 Ikeda prescribed a more moderate approach, "urging its members to adopt an attitude of openness to others"; the method Soka Gakkai prefers since then is called shoju – "dialogue or conversation designed to persuade people rather than convert them", though this is often referred to still as "shakubuku spirit". In 2014 the Soka Gakkai changed the "Religious Tenets" section of its Rules and Regulations as regards propagation.  Formerly, the Tenets said the Soka Gakkai "would seek to realize its ultimate goal – the widespread propagation of Nichiren Daishonin's Buddhism throughout Jambudvipa (the world), thus fulfilling the Daishonin's mandate."  The new version says "it shall strive, through each individual achieving their human revolution, to realize as its ultimate goal the worldwide propagation of Nichiren Daishonin's Buddhism, thus fulfilling the Daishonin's mandate."  According to Soka Gakkai President Harada, "worldwide propagation" is a function of individuals undergoing positive change in their lives.  The belief of the Soka Gakkai, then, is that propagation activities give meaning both to the activity itself and to the personal lives of its members.

History
The following are categorized records of the first three presidents of the organization, their leadership and list of contributions.

Makiguchi years: 1930–44

Foundation

In 1928, educators Tsunesaburō Makiguchi and Jōsei Toda both converted to Nichiren Buddhism. The Soka Gakkai officially traces its foundation to November 1930, when Makiguchi and Toda published the first volume of Makiguchi's magnum opus on educational reform, Sōka Kyōikugaku Taikei (創価教育学体系, The System of Value-Creating Pedagogy).  The first general meeting of the organization, then under the name Sōka Kyōiku Gakkai ("Value Creating Educational Society"), took place in 1937.
   
The membership eventually came to change from teachers interested in educational reform to people from all walks of life, drawn by the religious elements of Makiguchi's beliefs in Nichiren Buddhism.  The group had a focus on proselytization growing from an attendance of 60 people at its first meeting to about 300 at its next meeting in 1940.

Repression during the war

Makiguchi, as did Nichiren, attributed the political troubles Japan was experiencing to supposedly false religious doctrines that held sway. His religious beliefs motivated him to take a stand against the government, earning him a reputation as a political dissident. He regarded Nichiren Buddhism as religious motivation for "active engagement to promote social good, even if it led to defiance of state authority". The organization soon attracted the attention of the authorities.

In 1943, the group was instrumental in forcing Nichiren Shōshū to refuse a government-sponsored mandate to merge with Nichiren Shū, per the Religious Organizations Law which had been established in 1939. As the war progressed, the government had ordered that a talisman from the Shinto shrine should be placed in every home and temple. While the Nichiren Shōshū priesthood had been prepared to accept the placing of a talisman inside its head temple, Makiguchi and the Gakkai leadership had openly refused.  During his prison interrogation by the Special Higher Police, Makiguchi claimed that his group had destroyed at least 500 of these amulets, a seditious act in those days.

In 1942, a monthly magazine published by Makiguchi called Kachi Sōzō ("Creating values") was shut down by the government, after only nine issues. Makiguchi, Toda, and 19 other leaders of the Soka Kyoiku Gakkai were arrested on July 6, 1943, on charges of breaking the Peace Preservation Law and lèse-majesté: for "denying the Emperor's divinity" and "slandering" the Ise Grand Shrine. The details of Makiguchi's indictment and subsequent interrogation were covered in July, August, and October (1943) classified monthly bulletins of the Special Higher Police.

With its leadership decimated, the Soka Kyoiku Gakkai disbanded. During interrogation, Makiguchi had insisted that "The emperor is an ordinary man ... the emperor makes mistakes like anyone else". The treatment in prison was harsh, and within a year, all but Makiguchi, Toda, and one more director had recanted and been released. On November 18, 1944, Makiguchi died of malnutrition in prison, at the age of 73.

Toda years: 1945–1958

Jōsei Toda was released from prison on July 3, 1945, after serving two years of imprisonment on the charges of lèse majesté.  His health had been severely compromised and businesses destroyed.  He immediately set out to rebuild the organization that had been repressed and dismantled by the government during the war. From this start, Toda served as the link between the movement's founder, Makiguchi, and Ikeda, who led its international evangelism.

The reconstruction of the organization

While imprisoned, Toda studied a passage for the Immeasurable meanings sutra (considered the introduction to the Lotus Sutra) that describes Buddhahood by means of 34 negations – for example, that it is "neither being nor non-being, this nor that, square nor round". From this, he concluded that "Buddha" is life, or life force.

The "philosophy of life" restates principles formulated by Nichiren: "three thousand conditions in a single moment" (ichinen sanzen), and "observing one's own mind" (kanjin)

The concept of life force is central to the Soka Gakkai's conception of the role of religion and the application of Nichiren's teachings.  "Our health, courage, wisdom, joy, desire to improve, self-discipline, and so on, could all be said to depend on our life force," Ikeda says.

The groundwork for the organization's growth can be found in Toda's work during the years between his release from prison (1945) and his inauguration (1951). He officially re-established the organization, now under the shortened moniker Sōka Gakkai ("Value-creation society"), integrated his prison awakenings into the doctrine of the Soka Gakkai, began locating members who had dispersed during the war, started a series of lectures on the Lotus Sutra and Nichiren's letters, undertook business ventures (largely unsuccessful) to provide a stream of revenue for the organization, provided personal encouragement to many members, launched a monthly study magazine , and the newspaper Seikyo Shimbun, launched propagation efforts, and involved the active participation of youth including Daisaku Ikeda who was to become his right-hand man and successor.

Brannen, a Christian missionary writing in 1969, describes the Soka Gakkai's study program at this point as "the most amazing program of indoctrination Japan has ever seen".  New members attended local study lectures, subscribed to weekly and monthly periodicals, studied Toda's commentaries on the Lotus Sutra, took annual study examinations, and were awarded titles for their achievements such as Associate Lecturer, Lecturer, Associate Teacher, or Teacher.

"The Great Propagation Drive"

During "The Great Propagation Drive" of 1951–58 the Soka Gakkai doubled and tripled in size each year, resulting in a claimed membership of 750,000 families.

The drive began with the 1951 inauguration speech of Josei Toda when he assumed the presidency of the organization. Before 1,500 assembled members, Toda resolved to convert 750,000 families before his death. The goal was attained several months before Toda's death. The accuracy of this figure was never confirmed by outside sources.  The primary vehicle of the propagation efforts were small group discussion meetings. The driving force behind the drive were the efforts of Daisaku Ikeda and the Soka Gakkai Youth Division.   Segments of the Japanese population that had been marginalized or dislocated after the war were highly attracted to the movement.  The success of the propagation efforts rocked traditional Japanese society; the press covered many extreme incidents of propagation but did not cover the many examples of conversion accomplished through "moral suasion".

There are several competing narratives that attempt to explain how the Soka Gakkai was able to achieve this rapid growth.  One narrative portrays a drive powered by the "seemingly unlimited enthusiasm" of its members that was masterminded by Toda and channeled by his younger followers. The organization's own publications articulate this narrative. Ikeda explained his own efforts to introduce others to the Soka Gakkai. Ikeda gives accounts of how the momentum for propagation was created in Kamata (1952) and Bunkyo (1953). In his autobiographical novel The Human Revolution, Ikeda discusses in detail how the propagation efforts unfolded in the Osaka-Kansai region (1956). Common to all three accounts were efforts sparked by individual members who enjoyed their practice, long-standing efforts to build friendships, home visitation, small group meetings, and the "guidance" provided by Toda.  The resulting enthusiasm of members had an explosive effect.  Seager and Strand document support for this narrative.

A second narrative examines the Soka Gakkai's expansion through a sociological lens. White, in the first English-language sociological work on the Soka Gakkai, attributes the growth, cohesion, and sustainability of the organization to the organizational skills of its leaders, its system of values and norms that match the individual needs of members, and its ability to adapt to changing times.  According to Dator, the organizational structure of the Soka Gakkai, which values individual participation within small heterogeneous groups and parallel peer associations by age, gender, and interests, fulfills members' socio-psychological needs.

A third narrative tracks criticisms of the Soka Gakkai in the popular press and by other Buddhist sects.  This narrative implies that the propagation efforts succeeded through intimidating and coercive actions committed by Soka Gakkai members such as the practice then of destroying the household Shinto altars of new members. There were reports of isolated incidents of violence conducted by Soka Gakkai members but also incidents directed toward them. Fisker-Nielsen doubts whether claimed tactics such as coercion and intimidation could satisfactorily explain the ongoing success of Soka Gakkai's campaigns.

All scholars agree on the effectiveness of Toda and Ikeda's leadership throughout the Great Propagation Drive. Strand calls Toda "the most innovative, most dynamic, most successful religious leader of his day". More than charismatic or persuasive, he was effective due to his deep personal conviction that only the Soka Gakkai could renew a society in despair.  He used both aggressive hyperbole and melodrama while at the same time cautioning overzealous followers to be sensible in their propagation efforts. Ikeda was the operational head of the propagation efforts, serving as a charter member of the executive staff of the Youth Division (1951) and later as Chief of Staff (1954).

Death and legacy
Toda died on April 2, 1958. The funeral was held at his home, but the coffin was afterwards carried past weeping, chanting crowds to the Ikebukuro temple Jozaiji, where he was buried. The then prime minister Nobusuke Kishi attended the funeral – something that scandalized "quite a few Japanese" but was a testament to how the Gakkai had grown to a force to be reckoned with under Toda.

Murata claims that for two years after Toda's death, there was a leadership vacuum and the Gakkai had no president, as it was unclear if anyone was able to replace him.  Other scholars disagree, claiming Ikeda became the de facto leader of the Soka Gakkai right away.  Three months after Toda's death Ikeda, at age 30, was appointed the organization's General Administrator, in 1959 he became the head of its board of directors, and, on May 3, 1960, its third president.

Ikeda years: 1960–

Jōsei Toda was succeeded as president in 1960 by the 32-year-old Daisaku Ikeda. Ikeda would come to be a moderating and secularizing force. Ikeda formally committed the organisation to the principles of free speech and freedom of religion and urged, from 1964, a gentler approach to proselytizing. Under Ikeda's leadership, the organization expanded rapidly, both inside and outside Japan during the 1960s.

Within the first 16 months of Ikeda's presendency the organization grew from 1,300,000 to 2,110,000 members. By 1967 it grew to 6,240,000 families according to its own reporting. In 1968 over 8,000,000 people contributed to the construction of the Sho-Hondo. Between 1961 and 1968 the organization's Study Department (members who sit for graded examinations on doctrinal matters) grew from 40,000 to 1,447,000. By 1968, under Ikeda's leadership, the daily Seikyo Shimbun newspaper attained a circulation of 3,580,000. Today, it has a circulation of 5.5 million copies, making it Japan's third largest daily.

International growth

In October 1960, five months after his inauguration, Ikeda and a small group of staff members visited the United States, Canada (Toronto), and Brazil.  In the United States he visited Honolulu, San Francisco, Seattle, Chicago, New York, Washington, DC, and Los Angeles, meeting with members, the vast majority Japanese war brides, at discussion and guidance meetings, setting up local organizations, and appointing leaders to take responsibility.  He encouraged attendees to become good American citizens, learn English, and get driving licenses.

Ikeda also expanded the scope and pattern of the Gakkai's activities.  In 1961 Ikeda created an arm of the organization, the Culture Bureau, to accommodate nonreligious activities.  It had departments for the study and discussion of Economics, Politics, Education, Speech, and, later in the year, the Arts.

Ikeda and his team visited countries in Europe and Southeast Asia in 1961 and the Near and Middle East in 1962. By 1967 Ikeda had completed 13 trips abroad to strengthen the overseas organizations.  Parallel to these efforts Ikeda attempted to find the universal aspects of Nichiren Buddhism stripped away from Japanese context.

The Gakkai's first overseas mission, called "Nichiren Shoshu of America" (NSA), grew rapidly and claimed some 200,000 American adherents by 1970. Ikeda founded Soka Junior and Senior High Schools in 1968 and Soka University in 1971. "Soka Gakkai International" (SGI) was formally founded in 1975, on Guam.

Founding of the Komeito

In 1961 Soka Gakkai formed the "Komei Political League".  Seven of its candidates were elected to the House of Councillors.  In 1964 the Komeito (Clean Government Party) was formed by Ikeda. Over the course of several elections it became the third largest political party, typically amassing 10–15% of the popular vote. The New Komeito Party was founded in 1998 and has been allied with the Liberal Democratic Party (LDP) since 1999. Religious scholar and political analyst Masaru Sato explains that there is nothing surprising about Komeito becoming a member of a ruling coalition as the Soka Gakkai has become a world religion (as SGI) and history shows a link between ruling coalitions and world religions. He explains that in postwar Japan there were two major parties, the Liberal Democratic Party representing financial interests and large corporations and the Japan Socialist Party largely advocating the interests of labor unions. There was no single party that represented people who belonged to neither such as shop owners, housewives, etc. Until the appearance of the Komeito Party, such people were left on the sidelines.  In 2014 the New Komeito was renamed Komeito again. Komeito generally supports the policy agenda of the LDP, including the reinterpretation of the pacifist Article 9 of the Constitution of Japan, proposed in 2014 by LDP Prime Minister Shinzō Abe to allow "collective defense" and to fight in foreign conflicts.

1969: Crisis and transformation

In 1969, a prominent university professor named Fujiwara Hirotatsu authored the book I Denounce Soka Gakkai (Soka Gakkai o kiru) in which he severely criticized the Gakkai. The Gakkai and Kōmeitō attempted to use their political power to suppress its publication. When Fujiwara went public with the attempted suppression, the Soka Gakkai was harshly criticized in the Japanese media.

In response, Ikeda made major shifts to the Gakkai's message. He committed the organization to the rights of free speech and freedom of religion.  Admitting that the organization had been intolerant and overly sensitive in the past, Ikeda called for moderating conversion activities, openness to other religious practices, and a democratization of the organization. The Soka Gakkai's years of constant growth came to an end.

On May 3, 1970, Ikeda gave a speech at the Soka Gakkai's 33rd general meeting which radically shifted the direction of the organization. He stated that Nichiren's message could be understood as absolute pacifism, the sanctity of human life, and respect for human dignity.

In the 1970s Ikeda helped transition the Soka Gakkai from an internally focused organization centered on its own membership growth to one adopting a focus on a motto of "Peace, Culture, and Education". On October 12, 1972, at the official opening of the Shohondo at Taiseki-ji Ikeda announced the start of the Soka Gakkai's "Phase Two" which would shift direction from aggressive expansion to a movement for international peace through friendship and exchange.

In the speech Ikeda also announced that Kōmeitō members who served in national and local assemblies would be removed from Soka Gakkai administrative posts. Ikeda renounced any plans to create a "national ordination platform".

Over the years the Soka Gakkai has matured under Ikeda's leadership and its values accord with progressive internationalism.

"Citizen diplomacy" by Ikeda

Ikeda initiated a series of dialogues with prominent political, cultural, and academic figures which he labeled "citizen diplomacy". In 1970 he held a dialogue with Richard von Coudenhove-Kalergi centered on East-West issues and future directions the world could take.  Ikeda conducted ten days of dialogue with Arnold J. Toynbee between 1972 and 1974 which resulted in the publication of the book Choose Life.  In 1974 he conducted a dialogue with André Malraux. Today, the number of his dialogues with scholars, leaders, activists and others has reached 7,000.

In 1974 Ikeda visited China, then the Soviet Union, and once again to China when he met with Zhou Enlai. In 1975 Ikeda met with then Secretary-General of the United Nations Kurt Waldheim and United States Secretary of State Henry Kissinger. Ikeda presented Waldheim with a petition, organized by Soka Gakkai youth, calling for nuclear abolition and signed by 10,000,000 people.

Former relations with the Nichiren Shoshu sect
Generally speaking, Soka Gakkai and Nichiren Shōshū worked in harmony before 1990, although there have been moments of tension. An early example of strained relations came during World War II, in 1943, when the Nichiren sect's headquarters at Taiseki-ji was willing to comply with Japanese government demands to enshrine a Shinto talisman of the Sun Goddess Amaterasu inside the temple. Makiguchi and Toda, on the other hand, angrily rebuked Taiseki-ji for doing so, and the two were jailed for refusing to do the same (Makiguchi would also die while in prison). Occasional tension thereafter existed between the two because Nichiren Shoshu viewed Soka Gakkai as ultimately a subordinate lay organization, whereas Soka Gakkai felt itself to be an independent organization which "had its own direct spiritual mandate" from Nichiren.

In 1990, the Nichiren Shōshū administration excommunicated the Soka Gakkai with which it had been affiliated since 1952. In response, the Soka Gakkai countered by outlining Nichiren Shoshu's deviation from their own interpretation of Nichiren's doctrines, along with accusations of simony and hedonism among its ranking priests. The sect also condemned Ikeda for abandoning the aggressive propagation style (shakubuku) that led to some social criticism of the lay group, though not the priesthood.

The priesthood further accused the organization of impiety and sacrilegious behavior, citing the song "Ode to Joy" along with the promotion of its musical performance, The Ninth Symphony as evidence for non-Buddhist teachings.

In 2014, the Soka Gakkai rewrote its bylaws to reflect that it no longer had any relationship with Nichiren Shoshu or its doctrine.

A Soka Spirit website established in the 1990s that criticizes Nichiren Shoshu is still active.

Soka Humanism 

The Soka Gakkai practices what has been called "Soka Humanism", which it attributes to Lotus Sutra teaching that the "Buddha is life itself".

Accordingly, the organization also claims that the goal of human activity and religion is the welfare of human beings. Daisaku Ikeda writes:

In May 1970, Daisaku Ikeda clarified the Soka Gakkai's role, transcending proselytizing, was to create a foundation of humanism in all aspects of society. In addition, the cultural endeavors of the Soka Gakkai are viewed by its adherents as expressions of Buddhist humanism and are aligned to creating a peaceful and more humane society.

"Peace, culture, and education"
In the 1970s, the Soka Gakkai began to re-conceptualize itself as an organization promoting the theme of "Peace, culture, and education."

In later years, the three themes were institutionalized within the 1995 charter of the Soka Gakkai International.

Peace activities

The group's peace activities can be traced back to the Toda era – at an athletic meeting in 1957, Toda called for a complete ban on nuclear weapons. A 1975 petition drive against nuclear weapons by the Gakkai's youth division garnered 10 million signatures, and was handed over to the United Nations.

Culture of peace

The Soka Gakkai was included in a collective Buddhist response to UNESCO's "Declaration on the Role of Religion in the Promotion of a Culture of Peace", established in Barcelona in December 1994.  The Soka Gakkai's contribution to building a culture of peace is summarized by person-to-person diplomacy, the promotion of small community discussion meetings with egalitarian mores reflecting the Lotus tradition, the promotion of the values of compassion, wisdom, and courage to promote action to nurture world citizenship, and participation in cultural events to foster the culture of peace. Peace and human rights activists such as Dr. Lawrence Carter of Morehouse College and Rabbi Abraham Cooper of the Simon Wiesenthal Center, who partnered with the Soka Gakkai in various exhibits and presentations, praise the organization's efforts.

Support of United Nations

SGI has been in consultative status with the United Nations Economic and Social Council since 1983.  As an NGO working with the United Nations, SGI has been active in public education with a focus mainly on peace and nuclear weapons disarmament, human rights and sustainable development.

Each year, Ikeda publishes a peace proposal which examines global challenges in the light of Buddhist teachings. The proposals are specific and wide-ranging, covering topics as constructing a culture of peace, promoting the development of the United Nations, nuclear disarmament, the prohibition of child soldiers, the empowerment of women, the promotion of educational initiatives in schools such as human rights and sustainable development education, and calls to reawaken the human spirit and individual empowerment. The Toda Institute for Global Peace and Policy Research has published a compilation of topical excerpts.

Exhibitions
The Soka Gakkai uses its financial resources for a number of civic activities.  As a non-governmental organization of the United Nations, it has  participated in many activities and exhibitions in conjunction with the UN.

The Soka Gakkai has been active in public education with a focus mainly on peace and nuclear weapons disarmament, human rights and sustainable development. It has sponsored exhibits such as "A Culture of Peace For Children", which was featured in the lobby of the UN Building in New York and "Nuclear Arms: Threat to Our World".  Soka Gakkai also contributed to The Earth Charter Initiative with the "Seeds of Change" exhibit, "a 'map' showing the way towards a sustainable lifestyle".

SGI promotes environmental initiatives through educational activities such as exhibitions, lectures and conferences, and more direct activities such as tree planting projects and those of its Amazon Ecological Conservation Center run by SGI in Brazil.  One scholar cites Daisaku Ikeda, SGI's president, to describe such initiatives as a Buddhist-based impetus for direct public engagement in parallel with legal efforts to address environmental concerns. In India, Bharat Soka Gakkai (SGI in India) debuted the traveling exhibit "Seeds of Hope", a joint initiative of SGI and Earth Charter International. At the exhibit opening in Panaji, the Indian state capital of Goa, regional planning head Edgar Ribeiro spoke of lagging efforts to implement environmental laws and that: "Only a people's movement can take sustainability forward." In Malaysia, Tunku Abdul Rahman University College President Datuk Dr Tan Chik Heok said that this exhibition helped "to create the awareness of the power of a single individual in bringing about waves of positive change to the environment, as well as the society."

Establishment of institutions

The Soka Gakkai has established multiple institutions and research facilities to promote its values of peace.  The Institute of Oriental Philosophy (founded in 1962), among other goals, clarifies the essence of Buddhism to peace studies.

The Amazon Ecological Research Center (founded by Ikeda in 1992) outside Manaus, Brazil has pioneered reforestation, the creation of a regional seed bank and experiments in agroforestry.

The Ikeda Center for Peace, Learning, and Dialogue (founded in 1993 as the Boston Research Center for the 21st Century), promotes dialogue between scholars and activists to prevent war and promote respect for life.

The Toda Peace Institute (formerly called the Toda Institute for Global Peace and Policy Research) (founded in 1996) conducts peace-oriented international policy research through international conferences and frequent publications.

Responses to the organization

Soka Gakkai's pacifist stand has been questioned, along with the group's support of Komeito, without denying that the group is very active in "trying to establish the basis for world peace". In Japan, there is a widespread negative perception of SGI's pacifist movement, which is considered to be mere public relations for the group.

Nobel Peace and Chemistry Prize winner Linus Pauling has praised Daisaku Ikeda specifically for his work to foster a lasting worldwide peace.

Dr. Lawrence Carter, the chaplain at the Martin Luther King Jr. International Chapel at Morehouse College, considers the Soka Gakkai an important ally in getting the message of civil rights and non-violence to cultures beyond those that are Christian. He has said that Ikeda and the Soka Gakkai, with activities such as Victory Over Violence, have helped in his work to "revive the King legacy".

The Simon Wiesenthal Center, an international Jewish rights organization, has also worked with the Soka Gakkai.  Rabbi Abraham Cooper headed its efforts in the Pacific Rim, and in co-operation with the Soka Gakkai opened a Japanese version of the Center's Holocaust exhibit. Cooper said the organization's involvement actually improved the exhibit, and that through the Soka Gakkai, the Wiesenthal Center has found more partners in Japan.

Cultural activities

The Soka Gakkai sponsors many cultural activities for its membership as well as the general public.

Cultural institutions
The Soka Gakkai's subsidiary organizations also have a social presence.  The Min-On Concert Association is a subsidiary of the Soka Gakkai which Ikeda established in 1963.  It claims to sponsor over 1100 concerts each year. It has sponsored tours by international artists such as the La Scala Opera Company, about which Ikeda told Min-On's director that he "wanted average Japanese people to see first class art, even if we lost a lot of money".

Ikeda also founded the Tokyo Fuji Art Museum in 1983.  It houses collections of western and oriental art, and has participated in exchanges with museums around the world.

Performance art
Soka Gakkai considers dance and other genres of performance art to be a major aspect of its peace activities. It has a long tradition of "culture festivals", originating in the 1950s, which take the form of group gymnastics (through its world-famous gymnastic formations), marching bands, traditional ensembles, orchestras, ballet, or choral presentations.  The Soka Gakkai perceives these activities as vehicles for its members to experience the skills of cooperating with others, opportunities to engage in the personal discipline that performing arts provide, and occasions to overcome obstacles and to undertake one's own "human revolution". They enhance peer networks and understanding of and commitment to the goals of the organization.  In addition, they are viewed as expressions of Buddhist humanism and are aligned to the Soka Gakkai's ideals about creating a peaceful and more humane society.

The tradition, which began in Japan, has been copied in other Soka Gakkai organizations in the world.

The organization's musical and dance wings are organized into ensembles or groups in the local and national levels and are categorized as:
 Women's Corps of Drums/Fife and Drum Corps/Marching Bands  (Kotekitai Corps of the SG)
 Marching Bands/Concert Bands (Taiyo Ongakutai Bands of the SG)
 Drum and Bugle Corps
 Symphony Orchestras
 Pop bands
 Traditional groups
 Male/female/mixed choirs
 Youth Dance groups
 Adult dance groups/ballet ensembles
 Gymnastic formation groups (all-male/mixed)

Educational activities

The educational activities of the Soka Gakkai are often subsumed under the title of Soka education. Several educational institutions were either founded by the Soka Gakkai or were inspired by the educational writings of the Soka Gakkai's three presidents.

Organization

Formally, the Soka Gakkai International is the umbrella organization for all national organizations, while Soka Gakkai by itself refers to the Japanese arm. Soka Gakkai maintains an international political presence as a registered non-governmental organization with the United Nations.

The basic functional organizational unit is the Block – a group of members in a neighborhood who meet regularly for discussion, study and encouragement.  A number of Blocks form a District, and Districts are grouped into Chapters.  From there the Soka Gakkai is organized into Areas, Regions, Prefectures and, finally, Territories – all under the umbrella of the national organization.  Discussion and study meetings, the basic organizational activities, are conducted mainly at the Block level, though there are occasional meetings held at every level.

Membership
Soka Gakkai has, together with its international offshoot Soka Gakkai International (SGI), been described as "the world's largest Buddhist lay group and America's most diverse". Soka Gakkai International claims a total of over 12 million adherents. The majority of these belong to the Japanese organization, whose official membership count is 8.27 million households.

In a 1996 NHK survey, it was found that Soka Gakkai adherent made up somewhere around 3.2% of the Japanese population, or somewhere around 4 million individuals. According to statistics from the Agency for Cultural Affairs (a body of the Japanese Ministry of Education), the Japanese organization had 5.42 million individual members in 2000.

In a 2002–2003 survey of 602 Soka Gakkai adherents living in Sapporo, Hokkaido who had at least one child over the age of 18, it was found that 65.9% of those members' adult children were also themselves active members. Additionally, it was found that among the siblings of 418 second-generation members, collectively speaking, 69.5% of all those siblings were also active members. A further analysis found that "higher degrees of parental religiosity, better family relationships, and higher levels of participation in youth groups" contributed to higher degrees of religiosity among Soka Gakkai children during middle school years, although this effect was more pronounced in women than in men.

A study in Europe found that most of new members joined because of the personalities of the people they met within the organization; but the biggest reason for continuing is the positive changes they see in their own lives.

List of Soka Gakkai presidents
The following are the list of the presidents of the Soka Gakkai:

 Tsunesaburō Makiguchi – (18 November 1930 – 18 November 1944)
 Jōsei Toda – (3 May 1951 – 2 April 1958)
 Daisaku Ikeda – (3 May 1960 – 24 April 1979) +  (Honorary President of the Soka Gakkai International: 1979 – Incumbent)
 Hiroshi Hōjō – (24 April 1979 – 18 July 1981)
 Einosuke Akiya – (18 July 1981 – 9 November 2006)
 Minoru Harada – (9 November 2006 – incumbent)

Economic and social influence
The Soka Gakkai's newspaper, the Seikyo Shimbun, has a readership base of 5.5 million. Forbes magazine estimated that the organization has an income of at least $1.5 billion per year.  Religion scholar Hiroshi Shimada has estimated the wealth of the Soka Gakkai at ¥500 billion.

SGI's president, Daisaku Ikeda, has been described by journalist Teresa Watanabe as one of the most powerful and enigmatic individuals in Japan. A 1995 San Francisco SFGate article describes Ikeda as a "charismatic leader" who can display a violent temper in private.  According to religious scholar Jane Hurst, there is no indication he has exploited his position and his home has been described as "modest".

Japanese politics

Humanitarian work

The Soka Gakkai conducts humanitarian aid projects in disaster stricken regions. As an organization it is not only dedicated to personal spiritual development but also to engaged community service. After the March 11, 2011 earthquake and tsunami in Japan, Soka Gakkai facilities became shelters for the displaced and storage centers for food and supplies for the victims. The relief effort also included community support by youth groups, global fundraising for the victims, and spiritual support. SGI-Chile members collected supplies to deliver to a relief center after the country's 2014 earthquake.

Public perception
Today, Soka Gakkai is rarely criticized in mainstream news media. Ikeda occasionally contributes editorials to major newspapers, which also print reports on Gakkai business. Since the Komeito Party joined the ruling government coalition in 1999, widespread criticism by the media of the Soka Gakkai has abated and the Soka Gakkai is gaining acceptance as part of the Japanese mainstream. There has been a "fractured view" of the Soka Gakkai in Japan. On the one hand it is seen as a politically and socially engaged movement; on the other, it is still viewed with suspicion by some Japanese. James R. Lewis claims the Soka Gakkai's perception has suffered from sensationalist and often irresponsible treatment by the media even though the group has matured into a responsible member of society. Other scholars reject the cult label. Some scholars who utilize the Bryan R. Wilson typology of newly emerging denominations categorize it as "gnostic-manipulationist", a category of teachings holding that the world can improve as people master the right means and techniques to overcome their problems.  According to Anne Mette Fisker-Nielsen, "Soka Gakkai's relentless, but highly successful, proselytizing in the 1950s stirred up fear in wider society. Soka Gakkai was portrayed by the mass media as aggressive even violent – although it is difficult to find evidence."  Throughout the 1950s, the Soka Gakkai was a relatively radical movement that remained outside mainstream Japanese society, but since the foundation of the Komeito in the 1960s, it has considerably moderated its activities and has become a very mainstream movement, especially after the Komeito joined the coalition government in 1999.

Soka Gakkai has long been a subject of criticism in the Japanese weekly tabloid news/magazine press. Press criticism of the Soka Gakkai should be seen against the backdrop of negative press coverage of new religious movements in general. It is important to understand that Japanese journalism is unlike that of the West. Scholars point out that less than two percent of  journalists in Japan have degrees in journalism. That plus feeble libel laws leave little recourse for the victims of malicious defamation. Associate Professor of Religion at Hamilton College, Richard Seager writes that it is time to cease being overly intrigued by the Soka Gakkai's history of controversy.  "Over the course of a relatively short period, the Soka Gakkai moved from the margins of Japanese society into its mainstream."

Cult appellation
During the early postwar decades, the Soka Gakkai found itself embroiled in various controversies and appellations of "cult" and "cult of personality" have become attached to it. Claims of personality adulation towards Daisaku Ikeda is among the centerpoint of criticism from outsiders and former practitioners of the organization. Some criticism are also sourced from its former affiliate, Nichiren Shoshu who shared the same negative sentiment in 28 November 1991 citing claims of heresy. 
Soka Gakkai stated that its characterisation as a cult was the result of negative and distorted media coverage.

Richard Hughes in 2006 and Mayumi Itoh in 2014 stated that Soka Gakkai's was no longer a cult, describing it as having matured, having progressive qualities, and calling its membership to be "excellent citizens". Criticism of the organization continues to exist, to which the organization describes its vision and structure as a continuing work of humanistic progress and continuous improvement.

International perception
The Republic of Uruguay honored the 25th anniversary of the SGI's founding with a commemorative postage stamp. The stamp was issued on October 2, the anniversary of SGI President Ikeda's first overseas journey in 1960.

In 2005, National Youth Council of Singapore award the youth of Soka Gakkai in Singapore for their "community and youth services" work.

The Soka Gakkai of the Republic of Cuba (SGRC) attained juridical recognition in 2007, following an official visit of Daisaku Ikeda in 1996. It has a membership of approximately 500 individuals spread throughout most of the country's provinces.

In 2008, Ikeda was a recipient of the Order of Friendship, a state-issued award of the Russian Federation bestowed on foreign nationals whose work, deeds and efforts were aimed at the betterment of relations with the Russian Federation and its people.

In 2012, President Ma Ying-jeou of The Republic of China (Taiwan) commended the Taiwan Soka Association for many years of effort in the areas of public welfare, education, and religious teaching. He pointed out that it had received from the Taiwanese government numerous awards such as "National Outstanding Social Organization Award", the "Award for Contribution to Social Education", and "Outstanding Religious Organization Award".

In 2015, Italian prime minister Matteo Renzi signed an agreement that recognizes the Soka Gakkai as a "Concordat" (It: "Intesa") that grants the religions status in "a special 'club' of denominations consulted by the government in certain occasions, allowed to appoint chaplains in the army – a concordat is not needed for appointing chaplains in hospitals and jails – and, perhaps more importantly, to be partially financed by taxpayers' money." Eleven other religious denominations share this status. In the same year, the Soka Gakkai constituent organization in the United States (SGI-USA) spearheaded the first "Buddhist Leaders' Summit" at the White House which was attended by 125 leaders and teachers from 63 different Buddhist communities and organizations.

In India the Soka Gakkai is associated with a renewed interest in Buddhism among urban, upper middle class, English-speaking youth.

Among the European new religious movements, the European Soka Gakkai organization is one of the most active participants in dialogues with the European Commission's Bureau of European Policy Advisors.

While they are not all formally affiliated with the Soka Gakkai, there are a number of overseas institutions that perceived to be associated with the Soka Gakkai, or with Ikeda.  These include the Ikeda Peace Institute in Cambridge, Massachusetts; the Toda Institute of Oriental Philosophy in Hawaii; and educational institutions in the United States, Brazil, Singapore, Malaysia and China.

See also
 Religion in Japan
 Buddhism in Japan

Notes

References
 Sōka Gakkai in America: Accommodation and Conversion By Phillip E. Hammond and David W. Machacek. London: Oxford University Press, 
 "The Sōka Gakkai: Buddhism and the Creation of a Harmonious and Peaceful Society" by Daniel A. Metraux in Engaged Buddhism: Buddhist Liberation Movements in Asia. Christopher S. Queen and Sallie B. King, eds. SUNY Press, 1996.
 The New Believers: A survey of sects, cults and alternative religions. David V Barrett. Octopus Publishing Group, 2003
 The Lotus and the Maple Leaf: The Sōka Gakkai in Canada by Daniel A. Metraux (University Press of America, 1996)
 Fundamentals of Buddhism (second edition) by Yasuji Kirimura (Nichiren Shōshū International Center [now SGI], 1984). 
 Sōka Gakkai kaibō ("Dissecting Sōka Gakkai") by the editors of Aera (Asahi Shimbun, 2000).  (Japanese)
 A Public Betrayed: An Inside Look at Japanese Media Atrocities and Their Warnings to the West. Adam Gamble & Takesato Watanabe. Regnery Publishing, Inc., 2004.  
 (SERA) Southeast Review of Asian Studies 29 (2007). "Religion, Politics, and Constitutional Reform in Japan," by Daniel Metraux, 157–72.
 Westward Dharma: Buddhism beyond Asia. Charles S. Prebish and Martin Baumann, eds. 2002.
 Igami, Minobu. 1995. Tonari no Sōka Gakkai [The Sōka Gakkai Next Door], Tokyo: Takarajima.
 Proselytizing and the Limits of Religious Pluralism in Contemporary Asia. By Juliana Finucane, R. Michael Feener, pages 103 122.
 Neo Yeow Ann Aaron

Further reading

Books 
 Strand, Clark: Waking the Buddha – how the most dynamic and empowering buddhist movement in history is changing our concept of religion. Strand examines how the Soka Gakkai, based on the insight that "Buddha is life", has evolved a model in which religion serves the needs of its practitioners, rather than the practitioners adhering to dogma and traditions for their own sake.  Middleway Press, 2014. 
 Editors of AERA: Sōkagakkai kaibai (創価学会解剖: "Dissecting Sōkagakkai"). Asahi Shimbun-sha, October 1995. . AERA is a weekly investigative news magazine published by one of Japan's leading news organizations; this book attempts to present a dry, fair assessment of Sōkagakkai and Daisaku Ikeda and contains several interviews with Gakkai leaders.
 Shimada, Hiroki: Sōkagakkai no jitsuryoku (創価学会の実力: "The true extent of Sōkagakkai's power"). Shinchosha, August 2006. . Argues that the Sōka Gakkai is not (or is no longer) as powerful as many of its opponents fear, and that it is losing ground internally as all but the most dedicated are turned off by the leadership and fewer members need the organization for social bonding. Also notes that it is becoming more like a civic rather than a religious organization, and that inactive members do not resign because they want to avoid the ostracism and harassment that can result.
 Shimada, Hiroki: Kōmeitō vs. Sōkagakkai (公明党vs.創価学会: "The Kōmeitō and the Sōka Gakkai"). Asahi Shinsho, June 2007. . Describes the relationship between Kōmeitō and Sōka Gakkai and the development of their history. Touches on the Sōka Gakkai–Nichiren Shōshū split, describing it as the result of a power struggle and financial constraints, as well as on the organized harassment of opponents by Sōka Gakkai members, the organization's use of its media vehicles to vilify opponents, and Ikeda's demand for unquestioning loyalty.
 Tamano, Kazushi: Sōkagakkai no Kenkyū (創価学会の研究: "Research on the Sōkagakkai"). Kodansha Gendai Shinsho, 2008. . This book is an attempt to review scholarly studies of Sōka Gakkai from the 1950s to the 1970s and shifts in perceptions of the organization as journalists took over from scholars. Tamano takes the perspective of a social scientist and describes Sōka Gakkai as a socio-political phenomenon. He is also somewhat critical of some views Shimada expressed in the latter's recent publications.
 Yamada, Naoki: Sōkagakkai towa nanika (創価学会とは何か: "Explaining Sōkagakkai"). Shinchosha, April 2004. 
 Yatomi, Shin: Buddhism In A New Light. Examines Soka Gakkai interpretations of Buddhist concepts.  World Tribune Press, 2006.

News media (websites) 
 "Celebrating in Earnest: Buddhists Mark the Start of a New Year With Joy and a Strong Sense of Purpose" by Michelle Boorstein, The Washington Post, January 1, 2008
  Koichi Miyata, Soka University, Department of Humanities "Critical Comments on Brian Victoria's "Engaged Buddhism: A Skeleton in the Closet?"

External links
 Soka Gakkai International
 SOKAnet - Sōka Gakkai's official website (in Japanese)
 Lecture by Levi McLaughlin on SGI, Princeton University
 Soka Spirit, published by SGI-USA
 Sōka Gakkai, published by The World Religions & Spirituality Project (WRSP)
 Soka Gakkai (United States), published by The World Religions & Spirituality Project (WRSP)
 Ikeda Center for Peace Learning and Dialogue
 Tokyo Fuji Art Museum
 Fired staff speak out about Japanese politics 1:07:00
 Seikyo Shimbun
 Documentary on Soka Gakkai "Embattled Buddhists: Under the Rising Sun"
 Buddhist in America

 
Japanese new religions
Nichiren Buddhism
Buddhist new religious movements
1930 establishments in Japan
Religious organizations established in 1930
Buddhism articles needing attention
Buddhism-related controversies